Saroke, (Urdu ساروکی and in alternative spellings Saroki), is a town located on the southwest side of the city of Wazirabad in the Gujranwala district of Punjab, Pakistan. It lies south of Khanki Head, southwest of Mansoorwali, east of Dharowal, and north of Ahmad Nagar Chatta.

Saroke is the main point of all nearest towns villages, all the villages near it are dependent on saroke , because Saroke have facilities likes schools , medical , market etc

History 
It has existed since the area was controlled by Sikhs. It is the most populous town in the sub-district (Tehsil) of Wazirabad and was not widely known before the Martyrdom of Amir Abdur Rehman Cheema. It is the most populous town in the sub-district of Wazirabad.

Education 
Saroke is notable as the center of education for all nearby areas. These include Haider Memorial Higher Secondary School, THE  Bright way 
School, Rana Naveed Pilot School, Oxford Grammar School, Dar e Arqam School and Govt High School.

Division
Saroke is divided into several parts.

Main Town
Most of the population live in the main town. Most educational institutions, clinics, hospitals,s, etc. are also in the main town.
The main town is subdivided into Mohallas (like sub-localities). These include:
 Mohallah Shamali
 Mohallah Baagh Wala
 Androoni Mohallah
 Mohallah Shahzinda Wali
 Mohallah Faisalabad
 Mohallah Haji Arab
 Mohallah Janoobi

Sub Localities
 Islamabad, (Urdu اسلام آباد) is located to the far north of the town and lies west of Saeedabad, northwest of Rehman Pura and East of Faqeeranwali Khurd. Peoples living in Islamabad are immigrants of Kashmir who migrated as the result of First Kashmir war.

Rehman Pura, (Urdu رحمان پورہ) is located north of the town and lies southeast of Islamabad and southwest of Saeedabad. It is a small locality. Peoples living here are Rajputs shifted from the main Saroki town.

Faqeeranwali Khurd, (Urdu فقیرانوالی خورد) is located northwest of the town and lies west of Islamabad. Faqeeranwali is not populous as compared to Islamabad.

Jeune Wali is located to east of the Town.

Sports
Cricket, football and kabaddi are very popular sports in Saroke.

Climate
Saroke has a hot semi-arid climate (BSh), according to the Köppen-Geiger system, and changes throughout the year. During summer (June to September), the temperature reaches . The highest precipitation months are usually July and August when the monsoon reaches Punjab.

References

Cities and towns in Gujranwala District